Gwersyllt Foresters were a Welsh football team from the village of Gwersyllt, Wrexham.

History
Foresters were formed in April 1877 and participated in the inaugural Welsh Cup competition. They played their home games at Gwersyllt Park, and their colours are recorded as being green and red. Their first match was against Wrexham on 6 October 1877, a 9–0 defeat where Gwersyllt played in Red and Blue stripes. No record of them exists beyond November 1884.

Cup History

Colours

Gwersyllt Foresters were reported as playing in Green and Red against Northwich, however the actual design of the kit is unknown.

References

Defunct football clubs in Wales
Sport in Wrexham
Sport in Wrexham County Borough
Football clubs in Wrexham